Lewis Brooks Patterson (January 4, 1939 – August 3, 2019) was an American lawyer and politician who served as County Executive of Oakland County, Michigan from 1992 until his death in 2019. He was known as a pioneer of the success of Oakland County and its AAA bond rating.

Education
Born in Detroit, Michigan, Patterson graduated from the University of Detroit Jesuit High School and Academy in 1957. He served in the United States Army from 1962 to 1964. He received a Bachelor's degree from the University of Detroit, and his Juris Doctor in 1967 from its law school. In 2005, he was Alumnus of the Year at his alma mater.

Career

Following 16 years as the Prosecutor of Oakland County, he was elected in 1992 to the office of County Executive. He was re-elected to a sixth term in 2012.

During his years as County Executive, Patterson faced serious health problems, twice undergoing surgery to place stents to control blood flow and, in August 2012, being severely injured as the passenger in a car crash when his Cadillac was T-boned by a Volkswagen test car. The incident left him hospitalized for a month and then placed in a medical facility for physical rehabilitation. His driver was paralyzed. While in care in October 2012, Patterson dismissed claims that his injuries left him unfit to serve if reelected. Patterson sometimes used a wheelchair due to the injuries he suffered in the accident.  In March 2019 Patterson revealed he has stage 4 pancreatic cancer, and would not seek re-election the following year.

Personal life
In 2007, Patterson lost his son, Brooks Stuart Patterson, in a snowmobile accident and, later that year, lost his twin brother Stephen Patterson. In 2008, he established the Brooksie Way Half Marathon in memory of his son. The event is sponsored by local businesses and draws participants from the Oakland University campus and area residents.

Patterson died on August 3, 2019.  He was diagnosed with pancreatic cancer earlier in the year.

See also

References
Binelli, Mark. Detroit City is the Place to Be. Metropolitan Books, Henry Holt and Company (New York). First Edition, 2012.  (hardback version).

Notes

External links
Oakland County Executive official biography
2016 election campaign site

1939 births
2019 deaths
People from Loogootee, Indiana
Military personnel from Michigan
20th-century American politicians
21st-century American politicians
County executives in Michigan
Deaths from cancer in Michigan
Deaths from pancreatic cancer
Michigan lawyers
Michigan Republicans
People from Detroit
University of Detroit Jesuit High School and Academy alumni
University of Detroit Mercy alumni
American prosecutors
20th-century American lawyers
Michigan politicians convicted of crimes